Ákos Borbély (born 12 June 2000) is a Hungarian professional footballer who plays for Kaposvári Rákóczi FC.

Career statistics
.

References

2000 births
Living people
People from Kaposvár
Hungarian footballers
Association football midfielders
Kaposvári Rákóczi FC players
Nemzeti Bajnokság I players
Sportspeople from Somogy County